Oscar Downstream  is an oil & gas trading company based in Ilfov, Romania active at national level. Oscar  is currently the largest independent Romanian fuel distribution company and one of top 5 players in the oil & gas Romanian downstream market.

The company’s portfolio includes a network of 87 fuel stations that covers the main commercial routes in the country through its own two brands,  RO concept OSCAR  (a gas station network, developed by OSCAR as a franchise) and  DIESELpoint Access  (exclusively B2B, accessed with the OSCAR fleet card), over 2500 in-house fueling stations active at B2B clients at national level, a modern and extended logistics infrastructure.

The company invested over 50 million euros in the last years to develop an integrated logistic chain for the fuel distribution. It has its own network of 7 warehouses across the country with a fuel storage capacity of 65.500 m³ and a fleet of 77 fuel trucks. The company has 4 Greenfield investments in Șercaia (Brașov County), Ocna Mureș (Alba County), Roman (Neamț County), Zădăreni (Arad County) and 3 other storage facilities in Fundulea (Călărași County), Craiova (Dolj County) and Constanța. 
The products portfolio includes fuel (diesel and gasoline), AdBlue, bitumen and lubricants.

History

2004
 OSCAR Downstream  was the first to introduce on the Romanian market the in-house fueling station,  DIESELpoint concept and service , covering the southern region of the country. This became the main growth driver of the company, extending now to a national coverage of more than 2500 active  DIESELpoint  fueling stations at B2B clients, used as a fueling point on the companies premises.

2007
The company bought its first fuel truck, having in mind the development of its own integrated logistic chain. Today it includes 77 fuels trucks.

2010
The company launched a new service concept, DIESELpoint Access, automated transit fuel stations dedicated to B2B, located on the main commercial routes and easily accessible with the OSCAR fleet card. The  DIESELpoint  network now consists of 31 stations.

2014
 OSCAR Downstream  ranked 5th in top 5 players on the oil & gas downstream market in Romania.

2016
 OSCAR  develops a new service,  DIESELpoint Plus, a combination between the 20,000 L in-house fueling station and the fleet card system, accessible with the OSCAR fuel card. It is a premium service for companies that need a complex fueling solution on their own premises.

The company received its first  True Leaders  award for „The best Romanian Oil & Gas company” by ICAP Romania, for simultaneously fulfilling 4 criteria: profitability, an increased number of employees in 2015 vs 2014, leader in their industry, ICAP credit score: A2.

2017
 OSCAR  won 3 awards:
The international World Finance Awards for „The Best Downstream Company in Eastern Europe”
The Business Champions award Business Champions for Romania for companies with turnover larger than 15 million Euros
The True Leaders award by ICAP Romania, for the second time in two consecutive years

The end of 2017 came with the first B2C station, under the name RO, a fuel network franchise brand developed by OSCAR' together with 4 new fuel types in the OSCAR’s portfolio under the name ACTIS and FORTIS, superior fuels developed for B2C. The RO franchise brand was developed to complete the DIESELpoint Access network, with additional services and products. The RO network now has 56 gas stations in Romania.

2019
OSCAR Received the third True Leaders award from ICAP Romania.

Present
The company has grown in the last years as an important player that operates in Romania a national gas station network, with 87 stations in the OSCAR network (56 RO franchise stations and 31 DIESELpoint Access stations) and a large number of fuel card acceptances (DKV, Eurowag, UTA, AS24).

References

External links

Official website
Electric power companies of Romania
Oil and gas companies of Romania